Miltos Gougoulakis (born 1 February 1977 in Athens) is a Greek football player who last played for Saronikos F.C. in the Gamma Ethniki.

Gougoulakis played for Egaleo in the Greek Super League during the 2003–04 season.

References

1977 births
Living people
Association football defenders
Aiolikos F.C. players
Egaleo F.C. players
Doxa Vyronas F.C. players
Footballers from Athens
Greek footballers